Cellosaurus is an online knowledge base on cell lines, which attempts to document all cell lines used in biomedical research. It is provided by the Swiss Institute of Bioinformatics (SIB). It is an ELIXIR Core Data Resource as well as an IRDiRC's Recognized Resource.  It is the contributing resource for cell lines on the Resource Identification Portal. As of December 2022, it contains information for more than 144,000 cell lines.

Its scope includes immortalised cell lines, naturally immortal cell lines (example: embryonic stem cells) and finite life cell lines when those are distributed and used widely. The Cellosaurus provides a wealth of manually curated information; for each cell line it lists a recommended name, synonyms and the species of origin. Other types of information include standardised disease terminology (for cancer or genetic disorder cell lines), the transformant used to immortalise a cell line, transfected or knocked-out genes, microsatellite instability, doubling time, gender and age of donor (patient or animal), important sequence variations, web links, publication references and cross-references to close to 100 different databases, ontologies, cell collections and other relevant resources.

Since many cell lines used in research have been misidentified or contaminated, the Cellosaurus keeps track of problematic cell lines, including all those listed in the International Cell Line Authentication Committee (ICLAC) tables. For human as well as some dog cell lines, it provides short tandem repeat (STR) profile information. Since July 2018, cell lines in the Cellosaurus are represented as items in Wikidata. In March 2020, the Cellosaurus created a page containing cell line information relevant to SARS-CoV-2 in response to the COVID-19 pandemic.

The Cellosaurus encyclopedia is widely recognized as an authoritative source for cell line information, providing unique identifiers  and as source of curated information.

References

External links
Cellosaurus
Introductory video on the Cellosaurus
GitHub directory of Cellosaurus
Record in FAIRsharing.org
Record in Identifiers.org

Molecular biology
Biological databases
Cell biology
Cell culture